USS Corson (AVP-37) was a United States Navy Barnegat-class small seaplane tender in commission from 1944 to 1946 and from 1951 to 1956.

Construction and commissioning

Corson was launched on 16 July 1944 by Lake Washington Shipyard, Houghton, Washington, sponsored by Mrs. G. A. Hatton. Corson was commissioned 3 December 1944.

World War II operations 

Corson departed San Diego, California, on 12 February 1945, tended seaplanes briefly at Pearl Harbor, Hawaii, and at Eniwetok, and moved on to reach Ulithi Atoll on 1 April 1945. In addition to seaplane tending duty at Ulithi, she made two voyages to the Palau Islands in May 1945 and participated in the bombardment of Eil Malk Island on 7 May 1945.

Corson left Ulithi on 24 June 1945. She served at Eniwetok from 1 July to 7 August 1945. She then moved on to Okinawa, arriving there on 15 August 1945, the day hostilities with Japan ceased and World War II came to an end.

Peacetime service 1945-1946 

Corson departed Okinawa on 10 September 1945 and dropped anchor at Nagasaki, Japan, on 11 September 1945. She tended seaplanes at Nagasaki, at Sasebo, and in Hiro Bay until 20 January 1946, when she departed for Pearl Harbor and Alameda, California, where she arrived on 9 February 1946 for inactivation. Corson was decommissioned and placed in reserve at Alameda on 21 June 1946.

Korean War service 1951-1953

Corson was recommissioned on 13 February 1951 for service in the Korean War. She departed Long Beach, California, on 17 April 1951 for Okinawa, where she served as station tender from 11 May 1951 to 7 October 1951. She returned to Alameda on 26 October 1951.

Corson tended seaplanes at San Diego until her next tour of duty in the Western Pacific, which lasted from 8 December 1952 to 4 August 1953. During this tour, she tended seaplanes in Japan, at Okinawa, and in the Pescadores.

Peacetime service 1954-1956 

Corson returned to the Western Pacific to tend seaplanes off Japan from 4 January 1954 to 5 August 1954, and again from 17 January 1955 to 24 July 1955. During this tour, she served as station tender at Hong Kong, conducted reserve training at Subic Bay at Luzon in the Philippine Islands, laid a seadrome in the Pescadores, acted as advance base support at Keelung, Taiwan, and served as plane guard off Indonesia for United States Air Force jet aircraft flying to Bangkok, Thailand, on a good-will mission.

Final decommissioning and disposal 

Returning to Alameda, Corson was again placed out of commission in reserve on 9 March 1956. She was laid up in the Pacific Reserve Fleet.

Corson was struck from the Naval Vessel Register on 1 April 1966.  She was sunk as a target later that year.

References 
 
 Department of the Navy: Naval Historical Center: Online Library of Selected Images: U.S. Navy Ships: USS Corson (AVP-37), 1944-1966
 NavSource Online: Service Ship Photo Archive: AVP-37 Corson
 Chesneau, Roger. Conways All the World's Fighting Ships 1922–1946. New York: Mayflower Books, Inc., 1980. .

World War II auxiliary ships of the United States
Cold War auxiliary ships of the United States
Korean War auxiliary ships of the United States
Barnegat-class seaplane tenders
Ships sunk as targets
Maritime incidents in 1966
Shipwrecks in the Pacific Ocean
1944 ships
Ships built at Lake Washington Shipyard